Enos Kittredge Sawyer (August 24, 1879 – March 2, 1933)  was an American politician who served as the mayor of Franklin, New Hampshire, President of the New Hampshire Senate and as the New Hampshire Secretary of State.

Biography
Sawyer was born on August 24, 1879 in Franklin, New Hampshire to George W. and Louise C. (Barnes) Sawyer.

Sawyer was educated in Franklin High School, Phillips Academy and Dartmouth College.

1n 1908 Sawyer was elected the Mayor of Franklin, New Hampshire by 77 votes.

After he left Dartmouth College, Sawyer went to work in his father's meat, grocery, and provision business.

On February 28, 1911 Sawyer married Mabel E. White of Somerville, Massachusetts, who was a teacher in the Franklin schools.

In 1912 Sawyer was elected to the New Hampshire Senate from District 6. In 1913 Sawyer was chosen as the President of the New Hampshire Senate, Sawyer was the first Democrat  elected as Senate President since 1876 and he was the last Democrat elected until 1999.

In 1918 Sawyer was appointed the Director of the United States Employment Service in New Hampshire and Vermont.

Sawyer died in Franklin, New Hampshire on March 2, 1933.

Notes

External links
 Publications - Portraits of Legislators On State House Third Floor Enos Kittredge Sawyer

1879 births
1933 deaths
Phillips Academy alumni
Dartmouth College alumni
Democratic Party New Hampshire state senators
Presidents of the New Hampshire Senate
Secretaries of State of New Hampshire
American grocers